Jilihujie is a station on Line 9 of the Shenyang Metro. The station opened on 25 May 2019.

Station Layout

References 

Railway stations in China opened in 2019
Shenyang Metro stations